Touch Na Takuatung or spelt  Touch Na Takuathung, is a Thai pop singer and actor, famous and popular especially in the 1990s.

Biography & career
He was born as Kwantat Na Takuatung (ขวัญทัศน์ ณ ตะกั่วทุ่ง) at Thonburi side, Bangkok Yai District behind Wat Arun Ratchawararam (Temple of Dawn) with one brother and one sister. His grandmother raised him until he grew up in Bang Khae area. Na Takuatung called her "Grand Mammy" until the age of 6 his grandmother died. So he returned to live with his family.

He entered the music industry as a choir for famous bands in 1980s and entered a singing contest broadcast on Channel 3.

While he studied at Ratchadamnoen Commercial School after graduating junior high school from nearby Taweethapisek School, he formed a band with friends to play music in pubs at night. In 1990, he had the opportunity to release a first studio album in the pop genre with RS Promotion titled Sampas Touch, but it was not very successful.

Na Takuatung succeeded in 1991 when he released his second studio album Touch Thunder and changed the genre to pop dance, including breakdance and Dance-rock on his own. During this time, he was famous and popular (he was often compared with Grammy Entertainment's Jetrin Wattanasin). He released two more studio albums in 1993 and 1995, as well as several special albums, and also starred in many films and TV series.

In 1997, he was arrested in a drug case in a condominium near Tha Phra Intersection. The fifth studio album Touch Cyclone, released in 1998, was banned from opening the song. After this, Na Takuatung continued to release four more studio albums before turning to singing Luk Thung (Thai country song).

In early 2007, Na Takuatung graduated with a bachelor's degree in Political Science from Ramkhamhaeng University.

Discography
1990 : Sampas Touch (สัมผัสทัช; "Touch")
1991 : Touch Thunder (released; June)
1993 : Mahassachan (มหัศจรรย์; "Miracle"; released: April 16)
1995 : Touch V-4 (released: April 1)
1998 : Touch Cyclone1999 : Touch Happiness (บันเทิงเริงใจ; released: November) 
2001 : Sparking Touch 
2014 : Touch Screen

Filmography
Films
1992 : The Magic Shoes (รองต๊ะแล่บแปล๊บ; directed by Prachya Pinkaew)
1995 : Dark Side Romance (เกิดอีกทีต้องมีเธอ)
2001 : Where Is Tong (๙ พระคุ้มครอง; guest appearance)
2003 : One Minute To Love (คลื่นฝัน ควันรัก)
2004 : Beautiful Wonderful Perfect (เอ๋อเหรอ)
2005 : Dek-Dane (เด็กเดน)
2005 : Headless Ghost (ศพไร้เงา; direct-to-video)
Television series
1993 : Dok Kratin Rim Rua 
1993–94 : Kert Tae Tom (with Suvanant Kongying)
1995 : Poot Pissawas1996 : Pakarang See Dum1997 : Rak Rai Andap2000 : Prik Gub Klur2002 : Saeng Dao Fang Talay2005 : Thep-ti-da Rong ngarn2012 :  Moo Dang2012 : Rachinee Look Tung2016 : My Bromance: The Series''
Television shows
2017 : The Mask Singer Season 2–Nakak Ngorpa ("Sakai Mask")

References

External links

 ทัช ณ ตะกั่วทุ่ง Facebook fanclub

1969 births
Living people
Touch Na Takuatung
Touch Na Takuatung
Touch Na Takuatung
Touch Na Takuatung
Touch Na Takuatung
Touch Na Takuatung
Touch Na Takuatung
Touch Na Takuatung
Touch Na Takuatung
Touch Na Takuatung